The 9th Politburo of the Lao People's Revolutionary Party (LPRP), officially the Political Bureau of the 9th National Congress of the Lao People's Revolutionary Party, was elected in 2011 at the 1st Plenary Session of the 9th Central Committee.

9th-ranked member Saysomphone Phomvihane is the son of former LPRP General Secretary Kaysone Phomvihane.

Members

References

Specific

Bibliography
Articles:
 

9th Politburo of the Lao People's Revolutionary Party
2011 establishments in Laos
2016 disestablishments in Laos